Col de la Cayolle (el. 2,326 m) is a high mountain pass in the French Alps at the border between the departments of Alpes-Maritimes and Alpes-de-Haute-Provence in France.

It connects Barcelonnette in the Ubaye Valley and Saint-Martin-d'Entraunes.

It lies parallel to the Col d'Allos and Col de la Bonette in the Parc National du Mercantour.

The Var River has its source near the pass.

The road leads to the red-rock Gorges de Daluis.

Details of the climb

The northern side, from Barcelonette, is 29.15 km long, climbing  at an average of 4.1%. On this side mountain pass cycling milestones are placed every kilometer. They indicate the current height, the distance to the summit, the average slope in the following passage, as well as the number of the street (D902).

Starting from Saint-Martin-d'Entraunes, the climb is 20.5 km gaining , resulting in an average of 6.3%. No signposts for cyclists are placed on this side. However, every kilometer a sign indicates the altitude, as well as the distance to the summit (uphill) or the next villages (uphill and downhill).

Bicycle tourism
Together with the Col des Champs and the Col d'Allos it forms part of a popular round trip for cyclists (see for example ).

See also
 List of highest paved roads in Europe
 List of mountain passes

References

Cayolle
Cayolle
Landforms of Alpes-Maritimes
Landforms of Alpes-de-Haute-Provence
Transport in Provence-Alpes-Côte d'Azur